Chad Steven Henne (born July 2, 1985) is an American former football quarterback who played 15 seasons in the National Football League (NFL). He played college football at Michigan. While there, Henne became only the second freshman starting quarterback in Michigan history, accumulated a total of 32 wins in regular season play, 8,740 offensive yards, and 87 touchdowns, and in his senior season led the Wolverines to a Capital One Bowl victory over Florida. He was subsequently named as the game's MVP after throwing for over 350 yards.

Henne's professional career began when he was drafted by the Miami Dolphins in the second round of the 2008 NFL Draft. Henne spent most of his rookie season on the bench as the back-up to veteran quarterback Chad Pennington. In his second season with the Dolphins, Henne started the majority of the 2009 season after Pennington was unable to play due to an injury. Henne would go on to act as a starter for several seasons for both the Dolphins and Jacksonville Jaguars, before serving as a backup for the Jaguars. In 2018 he signed with the Kansas City Chiefs serving as a backup as well, winning two Super Bowls with the team.

High school career
Henne moved into the Wilson School District prior to the start of his 3rd grade year in 1994. He played in 43 scholastic games for the Bulldogs (42 starts) over four seasons, earning a record of 33–10. His Wilson football teams won two Lancaster-Lebanon League Section 1 titles, the first his freshman year (2000) and the second his junior season (2002). Henne's third scholastic year was his most successful, both individually and as a team. His 2002 Wilson Bulldogs squad finished their regular season undefeated with a record of 10–0 and were the 2002 PIAA District 3 AAAA runner-up, falling to Central Dauphin in a thrilling championship game. He amassed 7,071 passing yards in his high school career, which was fourth-most all-time in PIAA history (and first in PIAA District 3) at the conclusion of the Henne's senior season in the fall of 2003, behind John Veach (Mount Carmel Area), Evan Kraky (Lakeland), and Ron Powlus (Berwick). Henne owns three significant Wilson football program records (as of February 2020): career passing yardage (7,071); career passing touchdowns (74), and most touchdown passes in a game (5; tied). He was named to the Pennsylvania All-State Football Team as a senior in 2003, selected to participate in the 47th Annual Big 33 Football Classic in July 2004, was named the Pennsylvania Football Gatorade Player of the Year for 2003–2004, and earned national recognition as a member of the 2003–2004 Parade High School All-American Football Team. In October 2014, Henne was inducted into the Wilson High School Athletic Hall of Fame. In addition to his football accomplishments, Henne was also a member of the Wilson varsity basketball team for three years as well as an outstanding athlete for the Bulldogs track and field team, finishing as the PIAA runner-up in the javelin as a senior after finishing first at the District 3 meet two weeks earlier. Henne aspires to become a coach at his alma mater following his lengthy NFL career.

In 2000, his freshman season at Wilson Senior High School in West Lawn, Pennsylvania, Henne played QB in all 11 of Wilson's games, with 10 starts. He rotated at QB with junior Ian Firestone in the Week 1 storm-delayed win vs Harrisburg but would start the final 10 games for the Bulldogs and play the majority of the positional snaps. Henne led come-from-behind victories against Wilson's first three opponents – Harrisburg, Stroudsburg, and Boyertown – before a setback at Cedar Crest to open League play. Henne's Wilson team would win their next six contests, including a thrilling comeback victory at Reading, before falling in the 2000 District 3 AAAA semifinals to eventual champion Cumberland Valley, 21–7. His freshman season was an overwhelming success, with the team finishing 9–2 and earning a share of the Lancaster-Lebanon League Section 1 title (with Cedar Crest and Reading).

Henne's Wilson football team would struggle during his second campaign as a starter. The Bulldogs ended their season with an overall record of 6–4 and suffered three consecutive losses for the first time since the 1988 season.

At the end of his junior year in 2002, having been offered forty scholarships from various collegiate athletic programs, Henne narrowed his college options down to five schools: Miami, Michigan, Georgia, Tennessee, and Penn State.

Before his first game as a senior, Henne announced his plans to become a Wolverine at the University of Michigan. He was named to the preseason Pennsylvania All-State Football First-team. Following high school, Henne played in the 2004 U.S. Army All-American Bowl as a member of the East team.

College career
In 2004, Henne entered the season as a freshman for the Wolverines, and third on the depth chart behind redshirt sophomore Matt Gutierrez and redshirt freshman quarterback Clayton Richard. The Monday prior to the season opener against the Miami RedHawks, Michigan head coach Lloyd Carr announced Gutierrez would start even though he was suffering from a sore shoulder. A few days later, Carr decided to allow Henne to start in relief of Gutierrez.

Henne ended his first career game with a 43–10 win, completing 14 of 24 passes for 142 yards, two touchdowns, and one interception. Henne was just the second true freshman in Michigan history to start on opening day, a feat not seen at Michigan since Rick Leach in 1975.

Alongside freshman running back Mike Hart, he galvanized an explosive offensive unit that featured receivers Braylon Edwards, Jason Avant, and Steve Breaston. All five would later go on to the NFL. Henne's freshman season was highlighted by a triple-overtime win over in-state rival Michigan State  and a record-tying performance in the Rose Bowl against Texas.  He also tied the Michigan season record for touchdown passes with 25, first set by Elvis Grbac in 1991.

Henne was criticized in 2005 after Michigan, ranked in the top five of the preseason polls, stumbled to a 3–3 start. The sophomore quarterback was particularly scrutinized after his performance in a close loss to Notre Dame, in which he completed fewer than half of his pass attempts and lost a fumble on the goal line. After their 3–3 start, Michigan won four consecutive games to clinch the program's 21st consecutive winning season.

As a junior in 2006, Henne earned Rivals.com All-American third-team honors. He was a Manning Award finalist, Maxwell Award semifinalist, Davey O'Brien Award semifinalist, and Walter Camp Award candidate. The All-Big Ten Conference second-team choice started all thirteen games. He hit on 203-of-328 passes for 2,508 yards and 22 touchdowns with eight interceptions, ranking fifth in Michigan's season record list for touchdown passes, eighth in attempts and completions and tenth in passing yards. For the third straight year Michigan concluded their season by losing to Ohio State and then dropping their bowl game, this time to Southern California.

During his senior year in 2007, Henne completed 162 of 278 passes for 1,938 yards, 17 touchdowns, and nine interceptions. The first game of the season ended in disaster for Michigan, a loss to Appalachian State that was considered one of the biggest sports upsets of all time. In the following game Henne suffered a knee injury in the first half against Oregon, and sat out the second half, as well as subsequent games against Notre Dame and Penn State, before returning to the starting lineup against Northwestern. In the final regular season game, Michigan fell to Ohio State 14–3, completing an 0–4 career record for Henne and fellow seniors Mike Hart and Jake Long against the Buckeyes. Henne played his final collegiate game against Florida in the Capital One Bowl.  Henne was named the MVP of the game after he led his team to a 41–35 victory over the Gators and reigning Heisman Trophy winner, Tim Tebow.

For his collegiate career, Henne completed 828 of 1,387 passes for 9,715 yards, 87 touchdowns, and 37 interceptions. All five marks are school records.  Henne's passing touchdown total is second in Big Ten Conference history.

College statistics

Professional career

Miami Dolphins
Henne was drafted by the Miami Dolphins in the second round (57th overall) of the 2008 NFL Draft. He was the fourth quarterback chosen, following Matt Ryan, Joe Flacco, and Brian Brohm. His left tackle at Michigan, Jake Long, was the first selection of the draft and would again play alongside Henne in Miami.

2008 season
Henne agreed to a four-year, $3.5 million contract with the team on July 26. Out of training camp, Henne earned the backup quarterback role behind starter Chad Pennington. During the second game of the 2008 season, Henne made his NFL debut with 9:42 left; down 31–3 against the Arizona Cardinals. Henne spent the remainder of the season on the bench and only played in two other games, both divisional matchups with the New England Patriots.

2009 season
During the third game of the 2009 season, in the early third quarter of a road game versus the San Diego Chargers, San Diego linebacker Kevin Burnett knocked Chad Pennington out of the game with a season-ending injury to his shoulder and rotator cuff. Henne came off the bench in relief. Though he led the Dolphins offense to ten points in the final 20 minutes of the game, he also had an interception returned 31 yards for a touchdown by Eric Weddle.

Henne made his first career start on October 4, 2009, against the Buffalo Bills at home. Henne went 14–of–22 with one touchdown in a 38–10 victory, lifting the team to a 1–3 record. In his second NFL start, he led the underdog Dolphins to a 31–27 win over the New York Jets in a Monday Night Football game. He completed 20 out of 26 passes for 241 yards with two touchdowns. This was Henne's second straight win as starter and included a 53-yard touchdown pass to Ted Ginn Jr.

Henne consistently improved as the season went on, passing for 335 yards against the New England Patriots in Week 13. In Week 15, Henne passed for 349 yards in a loss to the Tennessee Titans. In Week 16, Henne passed for 322 yards in a loss to the Houston Texans. In Week 17 against the Pittsburgh Steelers, Henne had gained 140 yards on 16–of–20 passing with one touchdown and interception, but had to leave the game with an eye injury.

2010 season
On November 10, 2010, after a 4–4 start to the 2010 season, Henne lost his starting job to Pennington. Pennington had led the Dolphins to an AFC East championship in 2008. On November 14, during the game against the Tennessee Titans, Henne came in relief for Pennington who went out with an apparent shoulder injury. During the third quarter, Henne himself was injured with an apparent knee injury and was replaced by Tyler Thigpen. Henne returned to action in Week 12 against the Oakland Raiders winning 33–17. In Week 13, Henne went back to his inconsistencies. He completed 16 of 32 passes and throwing 3 picks in a loss to the Browns. The following week, he went 5–of–18 for 53 yards and one touchdown in a 10–6 win against the New York Jets on an extremely rainy day. In week 15, he faced the Buffalo Bills going 33–of–45 for 176 yards with one touchdown and one interception. This came in a loss, which officially eliminated Miami from the playoffs. In Week 16, Henne faced the Detroit Lions and finished with a loss. Henne went 29 of 44 for 278 yards with one touchdown and two interceptions. Henne had two opportunities in the fourth quarter to lead a game-winning drive and a game-tying drive, but poor play calling led to a loss. In the last week of the season against the New England Patriots, Henne went 6–16 for 71 yards with an interception. Henne finished the year with 3301 yards along with 15 touchdowns and 19 interceptions.

His job as starter was thought to be in question during the off-season when it was rumored that the Dolphins sought to acquire Kyle Orton from the Denver Broncos. Coupled with the acquisition of Carolina Panthers quarterback Matt Moore and rookie draft pick Pat Devlin, it was unclear if Miami would continue its commitment with Henne. The Orton rumor eventually fizzled and Devlin was waived and signed to the practice squad, leaving Moore and Henne as the two quarterbacks on the active roster. It would later be announced that Henne would have the starting job in 2011.

2011 season
Henne's 2011 starting campaign began well, throwing for 416 yards and a professional career-best passer rating of 93.6. These improvements were overshadowed by Tom Brady's 517 pass yards and the resulting loss to the New England Patriots. It was the seventh game of all time to have two quarterbacks surpass 400 yards passing. On Sunday October 2, 2011, in a game against the San Diego Chargers, Henne hurt his left shoulder at the end of a run on a broken play on the Dolphins' second possession and did not return. His injury was later revealed to be a dislocated shoulder in his left (non-throwing) arm. Slated to undergo surgery, Henne was placed on injured reserve and missed the remainder of the 2011 season. The Miami Dolphins announced on February 21, 2012, that they would not re-sign Henne, making him a free agent.

Jacksonville Jaguars

Henne signed a two-year deal with the Jacksonville Jaguars on March 14, 2012. In the Jaguars Week 11 game against the Texans, Henne came in for an injured Blaine Gabbert and threw for 354 yards and 4 touchdowns. Henne and Steve Young are the only two players in NFL history since the merger to not start the beginning of a game and throw 4 touchdowns without an interception. He started the final six games of the season for the team after an injury to Gabbert. After Gabbert was benched midway through the 2013 season, Henne became the starter for the rest of the season, starting a total of thirteen games. The Jaguars would go on to finish the season with a 4–12 record.

On March 7, 2014, Henne signed a two-year, $8 million extension for $4.5 million guaranteed with the Jaguars. Following a disappointing first half in the 2014 home opener in Week 3, Henne was benched in favor of rookie first-round draft pick Blake Bortles. Bortles remained the starter for the rest of the season, leaving Henne as the backup. In 2015, Henne remained the backup for Bortles. He did not see any action in the 2015 season. Henne signed another two-year, $8 million contract extension on February 18, 2016, to remain as the backup to Bortles. Over the next three seasons, he saw action in a total of four games as an alternate.  On February 15, 2017, the Jaguars restructured Henne's contract.

Kansas City Chiefs
On March 16, 2018, Henne signed a two-year contract with the Kansas City Chiefs. In the 2018 season, Henne was the backup to Patrick Mahomes. He appeared in one game in the 2018 season, Week 17 against the Oakland Raiders. On September 1, 2019, Henne was placed on injured reserve. He was designated for return from injured reserve on October 23, 2019, and began practicing with the team. On November 2, he was activated off injured reserve. Henne did not play a snap all season but won his first championship when the Chiefs defeated the San Francisco 49ers 31–20 in Super Bowl LIV.

Henne re-signed with the Chiefs on a two-year contract on March 19, 2020. In Week 7, against the Denver Broncos, he came into the game in relief of Mahomes and scored a rushing touchdown in the 43–16 victory. It was his first rushing touchdown since December 2, 2012, against the Buffalo Bills. On December 30, 2020, with the Chiefs locking up the number 1 seed, head coach Andy Reid announced that Henne would start the Chiefs season finale against the Los Angeles Chargers due to them resting their starters. It would be Henne's first start since Week 3 of the 2014 season when he was with the Jaguars. In the game, Henne threw for 218 yards and 2 touchdowns in the 38–21 loss. On January 17, 2021, in the Chiefs divisional playoff game against the Cleveland Browns, Henne came into the game in relief of Mahomes in the third quarter after Mahomes left the game with a concussion. Henne threw for only 66 yards and an interception; however, Henne had a 3rd down run late in the 4th quarter that gained 12 yards, which ran critical time off the clock and left the Chiefs inches from a first down. On the subsequent play, his pass to Tyreek Hill led to the first down, allowing the Chiefs to run out the clock and preserve a 22–17 victory.

Henne signed on March 24, 2022, a one-year contract with the Chiefs.

On January 21, 2023, Henne replaced an injured Patrick Mahomes and led a team playoff record 98-yard touchdown drive in the AFC Divisional Round victory over the Jacksonville Jaguars.

Retirement
On February 12, 2023, after the Chiefs defeated the Eagles in Super Bowl LVII, Henne announced via his Instagram that he would be retiring from the NFL.

NFL career statistics

Regular season

Postseason

Personal life
Henne is married to Brittany Hartman.

See also
Lists of Michigan Wolverines football passing leaders

References

External links

 
Kansas City Chiefs bio
Michigan Wolverines bio

1985 births
Living people
American football quarterbacks
Jacksonville Jaguars players
Kansas City Chiefs players
Michigan Wolverines football players
Miami Dolphins players
People from Wyomissing, Pennsylvania
Sportspeople from the Delaware Valley
Players of American football from Pennsylvania